Earl Anthony Robinson (8 December 1955 – 22 November 1980), better known as General Echo, a.k.a. Ranking Slackness, was one of the first reggae deejays to move away from 'cultural' lyrics towards 'slackness' (risqué or sexually explicit lyrics).

Biography
Born in the Fletcher's Land area of Kingston, Jamaica, General Echo was regarded by some as the most original deejay since Big Youth. He had a profound influence on many of the deejays that followed, particularly in the United Kingdom.

After coming to prominence on sound systems such as Gemini, Stereo Phonic, and Ray Symbolic, he operated his own Echo Tone Hi Fi sound system, and was one of the first major artists to achieve popularity on 'yard tapes'. Echo had achieved success with "Drunken Master" for George Phang, and had a number one hit in Jamaica with "Arleen", on  Winston Riley's "Stalag" rhythm, which was followed by the album The Slackest. This was followed by 12 Inches of Pleasure for producer Henry "Junjo" Lawes.

Echo was shot dead by police in Kingston, Jamaica in 1980 along with selector Flux (who also worked on his Echo Tone sound system), and Stereo Phonic owner Leon 'Big John' Johns, after they had stopped the car they were travelling in. The incident has never been satisfactorily explained. Echo's death inspired Clint Eastwood & General Saint to team up and release the "Tribute to General Echo" single.

Discography
Albums
People Are You Ready (1978) Ballistic (Prince Mohammed & General Echo)
Rocking & Swing (1979) Manzie
Slackest LP (1979) Techniques (as Ranking Slackness)
12 Inches of Pleasure (1980) Greensleeves
Tribute To General Echo (1983) Mandingo
Teacher Fe Di Class (2007) Equalizer (expanded edition of Rocking & Swing)
Stereo Phonic Live Session (with Madoo)

Contributing artist
The Rough Guide to Reggae (1997) World Music Network

References

1955 births
1980 deaths
Musicians from Kingston, Jamaica
Jamaican reggae musicians
Greensleeves Records artists
People shot dead by law enforcement officers in Jamaica